Glaucina erroraria is a species of geometrid moth in the family Geometridae. It is found in North America.

The MONA or Hodges number for Glaucina erroraria is 6488.

References

Further reading

 

Boarmiini
Articles created by Qbugbot
Moths described in 1907